The 2018 Amstel Gold Race was a road cycling one-day race that took place on 15 April 2018 in the Netherlands. It was the 53rd edition of the Amstel Gold Race and the sixteenth event of the 2018 UCI World Tour.

The race was won by Michael Valgren in a two-up sprint with 's Roman Kreuziger. 's Enrico Gasparotto finished third, two seconds behind the front pair.

Route
The race started on Maastricht's Markt, the city's central market square, and finished in Berg en Terblijt, totaling . The route, similar to the 2017 edition, was made up of four sinuous loops centering around Valkenburg in the south of Limburg. Organisers intended to make the race finale harder for a peloton to control. Maastricht and Valkenburg have been the start and finish locations of the Amstel Gold Race since 1998 and 2003, respectively, and engaged themselves to host the race until 2022.

The route contained 35 categorised hills, usually short but with a varying gradient and coming in quick succession throughout the race. Since 2017, the uphill finish on the Cauberg was abandoned, after it had been the last climb of the race for 14 years. Nonetheless, the Cauberg, the difficult and most iconic passage, was addressed three times during the race.

Teams
As the Amstel Gold Race was a UCI World Tour event, all eighteen UCI WorldTeams were invited automatically and obliged to enter a team in the race. Seven UCI Professional Continental teams competed, completing the 25-team peloton.

Result

References

External links

2018 UCI World Tour
2018 in Dutch sport
Amstel Gold Race
April 2018 sports events in the Netherlands